Cal Poly College of Environmental Design may refer to:

Cal Poly Pomona College of Environmental Design, an environmental design college in the city of Pomona, California.
Cal Poly San Luis Obispo College of Architecture and Environmental Design, an environmental design college in the city of San Luis Obispo, California.